PSNA may refer to:

 The PSN Authority, the regulatory body of the UK Public Services Network
 PSNA College of Engineering and Technology, a college in Dindigul, India